Veronica cymbalaria, the glandular speedwell, is a species of annual herb in the family Plantaginaceae. They have a self-supporting growth form and simple, broad leaves. Individuals can grow to 0.11 m.

Sources

References 

cymbalaria
Flora of Malta